John Reeger is a Chicago actor and playwright. He is married to Paula Scrofano and has two children, Adam and Alison Reeger.

Performances

Theatre at the Center
 Horace Vandergelder in Hello, Dolly!
 The Old Man in A Christmas Story: The Musical
 Seabon Faulk, HaHa Jones, Farley Wood in A Christmas Memory

Drury Lane Theatre
 Sherlock Holmes in Sherlock's Last Case
 The Wizard in Once Upon a Mattress
 Scrooge in A Christmas Carol
 John Barrymore in I Hate Hamlet
 Capt Hook in Peter Pan
 Fagin in Oliver!
 Henry Higgins in My Fair Lady

The Marriott Theatre
His fifteen productions include:
 Max in Sunset Boulevard
 Georges in La Cage Aux Follies
 Billy Flynn in Chicago

Court Theatre
His thirty productions include:
 Gabriel Conroy in James Joyce's "The Dead"
 Polonius in Hamlet
 Malvolio in Twelfth Night
 Col. Pickering in My Fair Lady
 Hay Fever
 Twelfth Night
 Piano
 Life’s a Dream
 The Learned Ladies
 Fair Ladies at a Game of Poem Cards
 Gross Indecency
 Nora
 The Little Foxes
 La Bête
 Putting It Together
 An Ideal Husband
 The Cherry Orchard
 Old Times
 Tartuffe
 The Philadelphia Story
 The Play's the Thing
 Henry IV, Part 1
 Travesties
 The Misanthrope
 The Triumph of Love
 Cloud Nine
 A Midsummer Night’s Dream
 Much Ado About Nothing
 Woyzeck
 The Seagull

Chicago Shakespeare Theater
 King John
 The Moliere Comedies
 The Winter's Tale

Northlight
 Woody Guthrie's American Song
 Enter the Guardsman

Steppenwolf
 The Ballad of Little Jo

Works

The Christmas Schooner
With Julie Shannon creating the music and lyrics, John Reeger wrote The Christmas Schooner which premiered at Bailiwick Repertory Theatre and received the 1996 Chicago After Dark Award for outstanding new work. A twelve-year (as of 2006) continuing seasonal run has followed as well as a CD, and productions in the Midwest, Texas and California have also been successful.

Based on the true story of a Great Lakes Schooner captain who risks life and limb to transport fir trees from Michigan's Upper Peninsula to Chicago's German immigrants during the late 19th century.

Let the Eagle Fly
With Julie Shannon again creating the music and lyrics, John Reeger wrote Let the Eagle Fly, the story of Cesar Chavez.

See also
 The Christmas Schooner
 Cesar Chavez
 Drury Lane Theatre
 Court Theatre
 Chicago Shakespeare Theatre
 Northlight
 Steppenwolf Theatre Company

References
 Author Biography by Music Theatre International (MTI)
  University of Missouri-Rolla's production
 season/Taleoftheallergistswife/taleoftheallergistswife.htm Apple Tree Theatre Biography
 Review of Winter's Tale by Chicago Shakespeare Theatre
 Review of James Joyce's "The Dead" at Court Theatre

American musical theatre composers
Living people
Year of birth missing (living people)